The  was a Bo-Bo wheel arrangement AC electric locomotive type operated by Japanese National Railways (JNR) in Japan between 1962 and the 1980s.

Design
The Class ED74 was developed as a four-axle version of the six-axle (Bo-Bo-Bo) Class EF70 electric locomotives introduced a year earlier on the Hokuriku Main Line, and was intended for use on services north of  where the gradients were easier.

History
The six locomotives were delivered to Tsuruga Depot.

Displaced by the arrival of Class EF81 multi-voltage AC/DC electric locomotives, the Class EF74 locomotives were transferred to Kyushu in October 1968 for use on the recently electrified Nippo Main Line. To enable use alongside the six axle (Bo-2-Bo) Class ED76 AC locomotives, a dead weight of 1.4 t was added to increase the axle load from 16.25 t to 16.8 t. The entire class was withdrawn by 1982.

Classification

The ED74 classification for this locomotive type is explained below.
 E: Electric locomotive
 D: Four driving axles
 7x: AC locomotive with maximum speed exceeding

References

Electric locomotives of Japan
Bo-Bo locomotives
Mitsubishi locomotives
1067 mm gauge locomotives of Japan
Railway locomotives introduced in 1962